Whitfords Avenue is an arterial east–west road located in the northern suburbs of Perth, Western Australia.

Route description
Whitfords Avenue is allocated State Route 83 east of Marmion Avenue, and Tourist Drive 204 (Sunset Coast Tourist Drive) between West Coast Drive and Northshore Drive. It is a four lane dual carriageway east of Northshore Drive, as well as between Hepburn Avenue and Northside Drive/Tenerife Boulevard, and is a two lane single carriageway in the remaining stretch between, though there is a section between the Pinnaroo Point entrance road and Flinders Avenue that is a two lane divided carriageway.

Whitfords Avenue commences at a roundabout, with the entrance to the Hillarys Boat Harbour to the west, Hepburn Avenue to the east, and West Coast Drive to the south. The road starts off as a four-lane dual carriageway, with the northern section of Hillarys Boat Harbour to the west and residential development to the east, reaching Northside Drive and Tenerife Boulevard  later, after which it promptly reduces to a two-lane single carriageway. It meets Northshore Drive  later; Tourist Drive 204 turns left onto Northshore Drive. At this point, Whitford Avenue bends to the east and reverts to a four-lane dual carriageway.

After Marmion Avenue, Whitfords Avenue gains the State Route 83 allocation and is now bordering Craigie and Padbury, which it does so for  before reaching the Mitchell Freeway. Along that stretch it passes the Craigie Open Space near the freeway. At the interchange with the freeway, the southbound ramp provides access to Whitfords railway station on the Joondalup railway line. The road then travels for  through the suburbs of Woodvale and Kingsley, and the Yellagonga Regional Park before terminating at Wanneroo Road at a traffic light controlled T-junction. State Route 83 turns right to travel south for a short distance to Gnangara Road.

History
Whitfords Avenue took its name from the Whitford Satellite City development through which it was built in the 1970s, which was later split into the suburbs of Hillarys, Padbury, Kallaroo and Craigie.

In 1985, the part of West Coast Highway between Hepburn Avenue and Whitfords Avenue was renamed to its present-day name, as Marmion Avenue was replacing West Coast Highway as the main route for Perth's northern coastal suburbs. In 1986, the road was assigned State Route 83, and it became an entrance to the Mitchell Freeway upon its extension to Ocean Reef Road in 1988. From the late-1980s to the mid-1990s, Whitfords Avenue east of Marmion Avenue was progressively duplicated; first to Mitchell Freeway, and then to Wanneroo Road, and then the section west of Marmion Avenue within the vicinity of Westfield Whitford City. The remaining section between Endeavour Road and Northshore Drive was duplicated during 2015 and 2016, and a short section alongside the coast was upgraded to a two-lane divided carriageway during 2017.

Major intersections

  Hepburn Avenue (State Route 82) east / West Coast Drive (Tourist Drive 204) south, Hillarys and Sorrento
  Northshore Drive, Hillarys and Kallaroo
  Marmion Avenue (State Route 71), Kallaroo, Hillarys, Craigie and Padbury
 Eddystone Avenue, Craigie
 Gibson Avenue, Padbury
  Mitchell Freeway (State Route 2), Craigie, Padbury, Woodvale and Kingsley
 Kingsley Drive, Kingsley
 Trappers Drive, Woodvale
 Barridale Drive, Kingsley
 Moolanda Boulevard, Kingsley
  Wanneroo Road (State Route 60 / State Route 83 south), Woodvale, Western Australia, Kingsley and Wangara

See also

References

Roads in Perth, Western Australia